The Ottawa Self-Transcendence 24 Hour Race is part of a triple Ultramarathon race (6h, 12h, and 24h) in the National Capital Region Ottawa, Ontario, Canada. The run takes place currently in July, organized by the Sri Chinmoy Marathon Team. For many years, this race was held on an outdoor track at the Terry Fox Athletic Facility, and then indoors at the Louis Riel dome, on a 400-meter track. Since 2017, the race has been and continues to be held outdoors at the Asticou Training Centrein Gatineau, Quebec (3 km from Ottawa). Runners from Canada and all over the world participate. It is the longest-running 24 hour race and oldest timed ultrarace worldwide. Runners from Canada and all over the world participate.

History 
The race first took place in 1981. Since its debut, it has hosted the National 24 Hour Championship on several occasions. Since 2009, it has also included a 6-hour, a 12-hour and a 6-hour relay race. Over the years, additional distance races have been added as well: 50 km, 50 mi, 100 km, 100 mi, and 200 km.

Records 
During the first race in May 1981, Al Howie set the Canadian and North American record, with a final distance of 239.987 km. The following year, he surpassed his record by attaining a distance of 241.726 km. The men's current course record is 242.919 km by Peter Holubar in 1990. The women's course record of 214.487 km was set by Jamie Donaldson in 2009. During this race, she also broke the US 200 km record for women. In 2013, Jon Olsen ran 100 miles in 11:59.28, setting a new American 100-mile track record and a new North American record. The race is listed as one of the world's toughest endurance challenges.

References

External links 
 
 Video: 2018  (Mandeep Ben Leba)
 Video: 2018 
 Video: 2017 
 Video: 2016 - (Get Out There Magazine)
 Video: 2015 - (Utpal Marshal)
 Video: 2008 -(Mandeep Ben Leba)

Sport in Ottawa
Sports events founded by Sri Chinmoy
Ultramarathons
July sporting events
Recurring sporting events established in 1981